Two ships of the United States Navy have been named USS Kitty Hawk (after Kitty Hawk, North Carolina):

 was a cargo ship and aircraft transport that served during World War II
 is the lead ship of the Kitty Hawk-class aircraft carriers, and was in commission between 1961 and 2009

See also
 Kitty Hawk was the name of the Command Module on Apollo 14

United States Navy ship names